Zoo Vet and Zoo Vet: Endangered Animals are computer games designed by Legacy Games.  In the games, you play a vet recently hired by a zoo, and have to give the animals vet care. Each level has five different animals to care for, and some animals get treated twice. In Zoo Vet: Endangered Animals, some animals have two of the same kind instead of treating the same animal twice. Some of the missions in the original include a chimpanzee with a sore eye and a giraffe with loose stool. Some of the missions in the sequel include an eagle with a broken wing and a gorilla with high blood pressure.

2004 video games
Legacy Games games
Life simulation games
Medical video games
Single-player video games
Video games developed in the United States
Video games set in zoos
Windows games
Windows-only games